The 1999–2000 Lamar Cardinals basketball team represented Lamar University during the 1999–2000 NCAA Division I men's basketball season. The Cardinals, led by first year head coach Mike Deane, played their home games at the Montagne Center as members of the East Division of the Southland Conference. The Cardinals finished the season 15–16, 8–10 in Southland play. They won the Southland Basketball tournament and earned an automatic bid into the 2000 NCAA tournament as No. 16 seed in the East region. In the opening round, the Lamar was beaten by No. 1 seed Duke, 82–55.

Roster

Schedule and results

|+ Schedule
|-
!colspan=9 style= | Regular season

|-
!colspan=9 style= | 

|-
!colspan=9 style=" | NCAA Tournament

References

Lamar Cardinals basketball seasons
Lamar
Lamar
Lamar Cardinals basketball
Lamar Cardinals basketball